Stenurus is a genus of nematode that infects the respiratory system and sinuses of cetaceans, which includes whales, dolphins, and porpoises. Up to 1700 worms may be found in a single host.

Species
There are 9 species:
Stenurus arctomarinus Delyamure & Kleinenberg, 1958
Stenurus auditivus Hsu & Hoeppli, 1933
Stenurus australis Sarmiento & Tantalean, 1991
Stenurus globicephalae Baylis & Daubney, 1925
Stenurus minor (Kuhn, 1829) Baylis & Daubney, 1925
Stenurus nanjingensis Tao, 1983
Stenurus ovatus (von Linstow, 1910) Baylis & Daubney, 1925
Stenurus truei Machida, 1974
Stenurus yamagutii Kuramochi, Araki & Machida, 1990

Formerly accepted species
Stenurus alatus Leuckart, 1848) Yorke & Maplestone, 1926 accepted as Pharurus alatus (Leuckart, 1848) Stiles & Hassall, 1905 (Superseded combination)
Stenurus arcticus (Cobb, 1888) Baylis & Daubney, 1925 accepted as Pharurus pallasii (Van Beneden, 1870) Arnold & Gaskin, 1975 (Synonym)
Stenurus inflexus (Rudolphi, 1808) Dujardin, 1845 accepted as Pseudalius inflexus (Rudolphi, 1808) Schneider, 1866 (Superseded combination)
Stenurus pallasii (van Beneden, 1870) accepted as Pharurus pallasii (Van Beneden, 1870) Arnold & Gaskin, 1975 (Superseded combination)
Stenurus phocoenae Dougherty, 1943 accepted as Stenurus minor (Kuhn, 1829) Baylis & Daubney, 1925 (Synonym)
Stenurus vagans (Eschricht, 1841) Dougherty, 1943 accepted as Stenurus minor (Kuhn, 1829) Baylis & Daubney, 1925 (Synonym)

References

Parasitic nematodes of vertebrates
Strongylida